Zhang Guangdou (1 May 1912 – 21 June 2013) was a Chinese hydraulic engineer. He was a specialist in hydraulic engineering, professor and vice president of Tsinghua University, and a member of the Chinese Academy of Sciences and Chinese Academy of Engineering.

Biography
Zhang graduated from National Chiao Tung University (now Shanghai Jiao Tong University) in 1934, obtained his master's degree in Civil Engineering from University of California, Berkeley in 1936, and a master's degree in engineering mechanics from Harvard University in 1937.

Zhang was the chief designer of the Miyun Reservoir and Yuzixi powerplant. He was also involved in the design of many major hydraulic and hydropower projects, including Sanmenxia, Danjiangkou, Gezhouba, Ertan, Geheyan, Xiaolangdi, and the Three Gorges Dam.

Zhang received numerous awards, including the Haas International Award from UC Berkeley (1981), the National Award for Technology Advancement (2nd Prize, 1985), the Ho Leung Ho Lee Technology Advancement Award (1995), and the Technology Achievement Award from the Chinese Academy of Engineering (1996). He was elected to the Chinese Academy of Sciences in 1955, and the Chinese Academy of Engineering in 1994. He was also elected as a foreign member of Mexico National Academy of Engineering in 1981.

Bibliography

References

1912 births
2013 deaths
Chinese centenarians
Men centenarians
Chinese civil engineers
Engineers from Jiangsu
Nanyang Model High School alumni
National Chiao Tung University (Shanghai) alumni
UC Berkeley College of Engineering alumni
Harvard School of Engineering and Applied Sciences alumni
Hydraulic engineers
Members of the Chinese Academy of Sciences
Members of the Chinese Academy of Engineering
People from Changshu
People from Zhangjiagang
Scientists from Suzhou
Academic staff of Tsinghua University